Julian Oliver Davidson (December 27, 1853–April 30, 1894) was a 19th-century American marine artist and illustrator from Nyack, New York. He best known works of the famous naval battles of the American Civil War. Davidson's works were exhibited at the Hudson River Museum, New-York Historical Society and the National Academy of Design in the 1870s and 1880s.

Early life

Davidson was born in Cumberland, Maryland in 1853 and educated in a private school in Hamden, Connecticut. He was a nephew of the literary Lucretia Maria Davidson and Margaret Miller Davidson of Plattsburgh, New York. He is the son of Colonel Matthias Oliver Davidson (1819-1871) and Harriet Smith Standish (1826-1902), who was a descendant of Myles Standish (1584-1656). In 1870, he left home to be on the crew of a steamship sailing around the world, where he learned an appreciation of drawing and painting of ships and boats. He returned to New York and settled in South Nyack, New York. In 1877, he married Cornelia Trimble Merritt (1852-1895) and had one child.

Career

Davidson began drawing at the studio of Mauritz de Haas, a Dutch-American marine painter. He was introduced to painters of the Hudson River School including Winslow Homer, Albert Bierstadt and Frederick Church. He stayed there for three years.

Davidson specialized in the naval battles of the United States. He best known works of the famous naval battles of the American Civil War. In 1884, he was commissioned to provide illustrations of naval scenes for the four-volume work The Battles and Leaders of the Civil War. Recognized by the National Academy of Design, two of his greatest naval paintings, The Battle of Lake Champlain and The U.S. Frigate Constitution, 'Old Ironsides' Escaping From the British Fleet" were displayed at the National Academy of Design's annual art show.

The Battle of Lake Champlain (1884) hangs in the Key Bank Art Gallery in Plattsburgh, New York. He has exhibited at the Hudson River Museum, New-York Historical Society and the National Academy of Design.

Davidson was an illustrator for The Century Magazine and Harper's Weekly, as well as a series of children’s stories he wrote and illustrated for St. Nicholas Magazine. Many of his illustrations can be found in the book, The American Heritage Century collection of Civil War Art.''

Death

In 1893, Davidson contracted a kidney infection. During this time, he continued to work in the studio of his South Nyack home. On April 30, 1894, Davidson died at his home in Nyack at 40 years of age. He was buried in the family plot in Woodlawn Cemetery in The Bronx.

Legacy
Davidson will be remembered as an important 19th-century American marine artist and for his detailed renderings of historical naval battles and local Hudson River scenes. On September 11, 1986, the Historical Society of Rockland County held an exhibition titled, "Julian O. Davidson (1853-1894), American Marine Artist. Curator Lynn S. Beman said that "This exhibition constitutes a total rediscovery of this important 19th-century American marine artist."

Gallery

References

External links
 Davidson, Julian O. (1853-1894)

 
 

19th-century American painters
American male painters
American marine artists
1853 births
1894 deaths
People from Cumberland, Maryland
People from Nyack, New York
Burials at Woodlawn Cemetery (Bronx, New York)
19th-century American male artists